Dunaivtsi Raion was a raion in Khmelnytskyi Oblast in Ukraine. Its administrative center was Dunaivtsi. It was established in 1923. The raion was abolished on 18 July 2020 as part of the administrative reform of Ukraine, which reduced the number of raions of Khmelnytskyi Oblast to three. The area of Dunaivtsi Raion was merged into Kamianets-Podilskyi Raion. The last estimate of the raion population was

Geography
Dunaivtsi Raion was a part of Podolia. It was one out 20 Raions of Khmelnytskyi Oblast. It was a large raion and ranked as the 5th among the largest with respect to the total area (1 182 km2 corresponding to 5.7% of the total area of Khmelnytskyi Oblast).

Subdivisions
At the time of disestablishment, the raion consisted of four hromadas:
 Dunaivtsi urban hromada with the administration in the city of Dunaivtsi;
 Makiv rural hromada with the administration in the selo of Makiv;
 Novodunaivtsi settlement hromada with the administration in the urban-type settlement of Dunaivtsi;
 Smotrych settlement hromada with the administration in the urban-type settlement of Smotrych.

1 city (Dunaivtsi), 2 urban-type settlements (Dunaivtsi and Smotrych) and 83 villages were located in Dunaivtsi Raion.

References

External links
 www.rda.dn.km.ua 

Former raions of Khmelnytskyi Oblast
States and territories established in 1923
1923 establishments in Ukraine
Ukrainian raions abolished during the 2020 administrative reform